Philadelphia Wholesale Drug Company Building is a historic warehouse building located in the Callowhill neighborhood of Philadelphia, Pennsylvania.  It was built in 1927, and is a seven-story, seven bay by five bay, reinforced concrete building with brick and cast stone facing. It measures approximately 190 feet by 112 feet.  It was built by the Philadelphia Wholesale Drug Company Building, one of the first druggist cooperatives in the United States.

It was added to the National Register of Historic Places in 1990.

References

Industrial buildings and structures on the National Register of Historic Places in Philadelphia
Industrial buildings completed in 1927
Pharmaceutical industry in the United States